Willem Roels (22 August 1889 – 18 March 1951) was a Dutch wrestler. He competed in the Greco-Roman featherweight event at the 1920 Summer Olympics.

References

External links
 

1889 births
1951 deaths
Olympic wrestlers of the Netherlands
Wrestlers at the 1920 Summer Olympics
Dutch male sport wrestlers
Sportspeople from Delft